Once in the Summer (Russian: Odnazhdy letom) is a 1936 Soviet comedy film directed by Khanan Shmain and starring Igor Ilyinsky, Leonid Kmit and Ivan Koval-Samborsky.

Cast
  Igor Ilyinsky as Teleskop / professor Sen-Verbuda 
 Leonid Kmit as Zhora 
 Ivan Koval-Samborsky
 B. Movchan as Kotya 
 A. Savitskaya
 Ivan Tverdokhleb

References

Bibliography 
 Rollberg, Peter. Historical Dictionary of Russian and Soviet Cinema. Scarecrow Press, 2008.

External links 
 

1936 films
Soviet comedy films
1936 comedy films
1930s Russian-language films
Soviet black-and-white films